George Hitchcock may refer to:

 George Hitchcock (artist) (1850–1913), American artist
 George Hitchcock (poet) (1914–2010), American actor, poet and publisher
 George B. Hitchcock (1812–1872), American involved in housing slaves on their way to freedom